, also known by the Chinese-style name , was a prince of Ryukyu Kingdom. Sometimes he was called  for short.

Prince Nakijin was the thirdth son of King Shō Iku, and he was also a younger brother of King Shō Tai.

In 1879, the Meiji Japanese government decided to abolish the Ryukyu Domain, and sent Matsuda Michiyuki to Shuri. At this time, Shō Tai claimed illness and let him to handle government affairs. Prince Nakijin tried to prevent Ryukyu from annexation by Japan but failed.

|-

People of the Ryukyu Kingdom
1847 births
1915 deaths
Princes of Ryūkyū
Ryukyuan people
19th-century Ryukyuan people
People of Meiji-period Japan
People from Okinawa Prefecture
Kazoku